George Beacham (27 October 1867 – 11 January 1925) was an Australian cricketer. He played one first-class cricket match for Victoria in 1898.

See also
 List of Victoria first-class cricketers

References

External links
 

1867 births
1925 deaths
Australian cricketers
Victoria cricketers
Sportsmen from Queensland